(abbreviated as) is one of Yatsuhashi Kengyō’s (1614–1685) famous pieces. The music is made from six columns, hence the name, and there are exactly fifty-two beats in each column, except for the first row, which has four beats more. Each column first begins slowly, and then gets faster and faster, but slows down to the original tempo at the end.

External links
  (Yatsuhashi Kengyō)
 The Insen scale used in Rokudan

Japanese traditional music